Demang Station is a station of the Palembang LRT Line 1. The station is located between  station and  station.

The station was opened on 6 October 2018.

Station layout

References

Palembang
Railway stations in South Sumatra
Railway stations opened in 2018